HMS Bloodhound was an iron-hulled paddle gunvessel of the Royal Navy. She was built by Robert Napier and Sons at Govan, to a design drawn up by the builder. She was fitted as a tender to the paddle frigate  at Portsmouth between 1849 and 1851, 

She was broken up in 1866.

Notes

References

 
 

 

Ships built on the River Clyde
1845 ships
Victorian-era gunboats of the United Kingdom
Gunvessels of the Royal Navy